Michele Rugolo (born 31 August 1982 in Montebelluna) is an Italian racing driver.

Career

Formula Renault
After competing in karting championships from 1992 to 1999, Rugolo competed in the Formula Renault 2000 Italy from 2000 to 2002, and then switched to Formula Nissan part-way through 2002.

Sports Cars
Rugolo competed in the 24 Hours of Le Mans in 2003, finishing 11th overall in a Durango-Judd. In 2005, he competed in the American Le Mans Series, driving a Dodge Viper GTS-R.  For 2007, he competed in the GT2 class of the FIA GT Championship, and moved into the International GT Open championship the following year.

He joined Krohn Racing in 2011 for its Intercontinental Le Mans Cup GTE-Am class effort, which saw class wins at the Twelve Hours of Sebring and Petit Le Mans. Rugolo, Tracy Krohn and Nic Jonsson helped take the team to a second-place finish in the class championship.

In 2012, Rugolo will return to Krohn Racing in the FIA World Endurance Championship.

On Wednesday before the 2017 24 Hours of Le Mans, Lucas di Grassi wasn't able to get fast enough out of the car due to an ankle injury. Michele was asked to step in at the last moment, to replace Lucas di Grassi.

Formula Three
Rugolo has also competed in single seaters, coming fourth in Italian Formula Three in both 2004 and 2006.

Formula 3000
Rugolo's success in F3 and connections with Durango, who also ran a Formula 3000 team, saw him called up to the series for the final race of the 2004 season; his home race at Monza. He retired from the race.

A1 Grand Prix
Rugolo is also one of A1 Team Italy's drivers for the 2006–07 season, although he did not compete in a race in favour of Enrico Toccacelo or Alessandro Pier Guidi.

Racing record

Complete International Formula 3000 results
(key) (Races in bold indicate pole position; races in italics indicate fastest lap.)

24 Hours of Le Mans results

Complete FIA World Endurance Championship results
(key) (Races in bold indicate pole position) (Races in italics indicate fastest lap)

Complete IMSA SportsCar Championship results
(key) (Races in bold indicate pole position) (Races in italics indicate fastest lap)

References

Michele Rugolo career statistics at driverdb.com, retrieved 14 January 2007.

External links
Rugolo's official website. 

1982 births
Living people
People from Montebelluna
Italian racing drivers
A1 Grand Prix Rookie drivers
Italian Formula Renault 2.0 drivers
International Formula 3000 drivers
24 Hours of Le Mans drivers
American Le Mans Series drivers
FIA World Endurance Championship drivers
International GT Open drivers
24 Hours of Daytona drivers
WeatherTech SportsCar Championship drivers
European Le Mans Series drivers
24 Hours of Spa drivers
Blancpain Endurance Series drivers
Asian Le Mans Series drivers
Sportspeople from the Province of Treviso

AF Corse drivers
Durango drivers
Target Racing drivers
Le Mans Cup drivers